The transcription machine is a special purpose machine which is used for word or voice processing. This special device manages audio video recording to transcribe them into written or hard copy form. So transcription machines are combination of transcribers and dictation machines.

History of Transcription
Transcription machines became very famous with the advent of cassette technology, and they can now be available in almost all the offices in the world. This is because the ability to record conversations and a speech can be extremely useful in the professional era. They're also most commonly used by students and reporters, who prefer accuracy in their work and want to have physical notes that are more durable.

Transcription machines have continued to change with the times. They are still mostly used with cassette tapes, as this is the cheapest way to make them, and the cassette on the other hand offers an easy and durable hard copy. However, more transcription machines are being manufactured as digital. Now, these kinds of recordings offer a number of advantages as its ability to load easily onto a computer, and thus not required to replace tapes and other out dated sources with latest storage devices like DVDs and CDs as they can't be after the user runs out of space. Moreover, digital recording offers the chance to dramatically improve the interface of transcription machines.

Where we use Transcription Machines

Originally, these machines are basically used as transcribers.
These machines are used in hospitals, schools and other voice oriented communications.
These machines are necessary in the precision of voice recordings.

Scope of Transcription Machines
First, as a transcriptionist, one must learn the different types of goods and transcription machinery that is needed to become effective in what is going to be done. Machines and software are making it possible for a transcriptionist to transcribe audio and video in written texts. However, if there is no machine or software, transcription can be a very difficult task for you to accomplish. Learn how you can use a transcription machine and transcription software, digital is even an advantage for you as a transcriber.

See also
 Dictation
 Digital dictation
 Transcription
 Dictation machine

Notes

References
 

Transcription (linguistics)
Sound recording technology
Audio storage
Office equipment